Khusus is a city in the Qalyubiyya Governorate, Egypt. The city lies north of Cairo. Its population was estimated at about 468,000 people in 2018.

References 

Populated places in Qalyubiyya Governorate